The London, Midland and Scottish Railway (LMS) Stanier Class 8F is a class of steam locomotives designed for hauling heavy freight. 852 were built between 1935 and 1946 (not all to LMS order), as a freight version of William Stanier's successful Black Five, and the class saw extensive service overseas during and after the Second World War.

Background 
LMS freight traction suffered from the adoption of the Midland Railway's small engine policy which had left it with trains double-headed by underpowered 0-6-0s supplemented by disappointing Garratts and Fowler 7F 0-8-0s.

The 8F design incorporated the two-cylinder arrangement of the Black Fives. They were initially classified 7F, but this was later changed to the more familiar 8F.

On the outbreak of the World War II, the design was chosen to become the country's standard freight design, reprising the role the GCR Class 8K had in the First World War.  The War Department had 208 8Fs built by Beyer Peacock and North British Locomotive Company and requisitioned 51 more.

Stanier 8F production for the WD continued until 1943 when the cheaper WD Austerity 2-8-0 was introduced.  Production for British domestic use continued until 1946.

Construction 

LMS nos. 8012–6/8–25/8/30–2/4/8–49/51/2/8/9/61/6/8/9/71/2/7–80/5–8/91/3/4 were requisitioned by the War Department in 1941 and renumbered 572–622 (not in order). These 51 locomotives were intended for service in Persia, but twelve never got there: four (former nos. 8066/8/71/87) were lost in the Irish Sea whilst being shipped in 1941 and eight more were damaged in transit, repaired and returned to LMS stock in 1943 (on loan from 1942), resuming their former LMS numbers 8024/69/78–80/5/8/93. After the war, ten were bought from the WD by British Railways in 1949, and were given BR numbers 48012/6/8/20/39/45/6/61/77/94, being their original numbers increased by 40000. One final locomotive, originally LMS 8025, was bought by BR in 1957 and renumbered 48775. Thus 299 former LMS locomotives were eventually in BR stock.

Not all were required immediately by the War Department, and so beginning in August 1940, 53 were loaned to the LMS and given temporary LMS numbers as shown. 25 of these were subsequently transferred to the GWR, still on loan from the WD, but retained their LMS numbers. No. 407, then on loan to the GWR and running as LMS 8293, was damaged in an accident at Dolphin Junction, Slough; after repair it was bought by the LMS in 1943, retaining number 8293. The remainder were returned to the WD during 1941 and resumed their original WD numbers. Others were loaned to the LMS but initially retained their WD numbers; in 1943, 22 of these (WD 549–551, 553, 555–571 and 623) were bought by the LMS and renumbered 8264–85. In 1948–49, 29 more (original WD numbers 300/1, 311/4/8, 332, 363, 376/8, 384, 394, 321, 398, 504, 518, 544, 373, 506, 401–3, 413, 438, 440/2/3/6/7/9) were bought by British Railways and renumbered 48246–63, 48286–92, 48294–7 without regard to any LMS numbers previously carried. Two more, originally WD nos. 307 and 320, were bought by BR in 1957 and renumbered 48773/4. 54 of the 208 locomotives ordered by the WD were eventually in BR stock.

Although none of these was built by the LMS, all were considered to be LMS property; those built by the GWR and LNER were loaned to the railways which built them, being returned to the LMS during 1946–47. All 245 entered BR stock at the start of 1948 and subsequently had their LMS numbers increased by 40000.

Overseas service

The War Department originally ordered 8Fs for service in support of the British Expeditionary Force, but they were not delivered until after the Fall of France.  However, most of them did see wartime military service overseas in Egypt, Palestine, Iran and Italy.  Many of these locomotives were later sold to the local railways in these countries, and some were also sold to Turkey and Iraq.

Egypt
Some of these were loaned to Egyptian State Railways (ESR) and the others were used by the MEF on the Western Desert Extension Railway (WDER). The scarcity of water made steam locomotive operations on the WDER difficult, and their smoke also attracted unwanted attention from enemy aircraft, so once American diesels began to arrive from late 1942 the use of 8Fs on the WDER declined. Forty locomotives were sold to ESR in 1942-44. The other two locomotives had accident damage, and were made into one good locomotive which was also sold to ESR in 1945. The remains of the last locomotive were bought by ESR for spares in 1946.

The MEF received another 50 8Fs from Iran in 1944, for use in both Egypt and Palestine, although 15 of these were transferred to Italy later in the year.  Some of the 50 were not in operational condition, and 4 were scrapped by the MEF in 1946 without further use.  Another 59 former Iranian 8Fs were transferred to the MEF in 1946, most of which were initially used in Palestine.  This brought the number of 8Fs in the Middle East Forces up to 90.

After the war the British military presence in the region waned, so the need for military locomotives declined. The MEF's fleet was largely sold off in 1947-48 to British Railways (39), Palestine Railways (24) and ESR (11).  Five returned to Britain for continued WD use in 1952.  MEF railway operation ended in 1954, with 10 8Fs being sold to ESR, and 1 scrapped by MEF following bomb damage.

ESR thus purchased a total of 62 8Fs from MEF between 1942 and 1954, and operated the type until 1963.

Iran
Following the occupation of Iran in 1941, WD locomotives were required to operate the Persian Corridor supply route, delivering war materials to the Soviet Union via the Trans-Iranian Railway.  163 8F were dispatched to Iran in 1941-42, but only 143 arrived (12 being lost at sea (246-444, 445, 608, 617, 619, 622 (latter 4 former LMS 8066, 8068, 8071, 8087)) and 8 returned to Britain with sea damage).  These operated as Iranian State Railways' Class 41.

The arrival of US Army Transportation Corps units in Iran with their own locomotives (including diesels which were more suitable for use in desert regions) made many of the 8Fs redundant, and 50 locomotives were transferred to the Middle East Forces in 1944.  At the end of the war the need for steam locomotives in Iran was further reduced and another 71 locomotives left for the MEF (59) and Iraq (12) in 1945-48.  The remaining 22 locomotives in Iran had all been withdrawn by 1963.

Iraq
Ten WD locomotives were transferred from Iran in 1946-47, being purchased by Iraqi State Railways in 1947, and two more locomotive were purchased from Iran in 1948.  These became Iraqi Class TD, and operated until the 1970s. One example, no. 1429, was still in existence in Baghdad, in 2014.

Italy
15 former Iranian 8F were transferred to Italy by way of the MEF during 1944.  After the war they were sold to Ferrovie dello Stato, where they operated as FS Class 737 until the early 1950s.

Palestine and Israel
Some MEF 8Fs were loaned to Palestine Railways during 1942, but larger numbers of former Iranian locomotives arrived in 1944, being used on the Haifa Beirut Tripoli Railway and other lines.  In 1947 24 MEF 8Fs were sold to Palestine Railways.  Following the 1948 Arab-Israeli War 23 of these locomotives were taken over by Israel Railways, being operated until 1958. The war stranded the other 8F, 70372 (NBL works no. 24680), on a small section of the main line near Tulkarm on the West Bank side of the 1949 Armistice line. It remained there, increasingly derelict, until after the 1967 Israeli invasion of the West Bank.  The Israelis finally removed and scrapped it in about 1973.

Turkey
Twenty five new WD locomotives were sold to Turkish State Railways (TCDD) in 1941 for diplomatic reasons, but seven of these were lost at sea en route (338, 343-345, 354-356. 343, 344 and 345 sunk when the  collided with Baron Pentland on 16 February 1941).  Two more locomotives were delivered in 1943, making a total of 20.  These served as the TCDD 45151 Class, operating until the 1980s.

War Department use in UK
With their intended role in France having ceased to exist, early WD 8Fs were loaned to British railway companies in 1940-42, being given temporary numbers in the LMS series.  However, by late 1941 the need for locomotives in Iran and Egypt was such that all of the WD locomotives which had been completed up to that point were recalled for military service, and 50 more locomotives were requisitioned from the LMS.  Locomotive WD 407 (LMS 8293) had been damaged in an accident whilst on loan to the Great Western Railway, so a 51st LMS engine was requisitioned as a replacement.

By 1942 the need for locomotives overseas had been satisfied, and the final 24 new WD 8Fs remained in the UK on loan to LMS.  Also remaining in the UK were nine damaged locomotives (WD 407 and 8 requisitioned locomotives whose voyage to Iran had been aborted after the  suffered severe storm damage – 4 other locomotives had had to be jettisoned into the sea to save the ship).  Two locomotives were sold to Turkey in 1944, and the other 31 were sold to the LMS in 1943.

In 1952 five WD 8Fs returned to the UK from the MEF in poor condition.  These were refurbished for WD use at the Longmoor Military Railway (LMR).  Three of these were sold to British Railways in 1957 becoming Nos. 48773-75.  The other two were transferred to the Cairnryan Military Railway and were scrapped in 1959, ending the WD's use of 8F locomotives.

Accidents and incidents
On 21 January 1941, Locomotive No. 8247 of the London, Midland and Scottish Railway was derailed at Wallneuk Junction, Paisley, Renfrewshire. Three cranes were needed to recover it.
On 2 July 1941, locomotive WD 407 (LMS 8293) was hauling a freight train which was in a head-on collision with an express passenger train at Slough, Berkshire. Five people were killed and 21 were injured. Despite suffering a buckled main frame, fractured pony truck, and crushed cab, the locomotive – on loan to the Great Western Railway from the War Department – was repaired at the GWR's Swindon Works and returned to the LMS in October 1941.
On 8 May 1954, locomotive No. 48462 of British Railways was hauling a freight train that became divided and was derailed at Plumpton, Cumberland.
On 9 February 1957, locomotive No 48188 was hauling a freight train that ran away due to the failure of the steam brake pipe in the cab. It collided with a preceding freight train and a diesel multiple unit at  station, Derbyshire. Staff there had enough warning to be able to evacuate the passenger train before the collision. Driver John Axon had remained with the runaway  freight and was killed, as was guard Creamer of the preceding freight train. Axon was awarded a posthumous George Cross.
In 1959, locomotive No. 48193 ran into the turntable pit at Kirkby in Ashfield, Nottinghamshire.
On 17 June 1960, locomotive No. 48616 collided with some empty coaches and eventually derailed and rolled down an embankment. Nobody was hurt and the locomotive was withdrawn and scrapped a few days later.
On 12 November 1961, locomotive No. 48674 was derailed by catch points between Four Oaks and Sutton Coldfield. 
On 16 December 1962, locomotive No. 48263 was derailed by trap points at Spon End, Warwickshire.
Eleven tankers were derailed and caught fire, severely damaging the locomotive. It was declared a write-off and was scrapped at Crewe Works in November 1964.

British civilian use

'The Big Four' railways
Some 331 locomotives were built for the London Midland and Scottish Railway between 1935-45.  A further 245 were built by the London and North Eastern Railway, Great Western Railway and Southern Railway in 1943-45 for LMS stock, though mostly retained on loan by the other railways during the war.  The LNER also purchased 68 Stanier 8Fs for its own use in 1944-46, classifying them O6, though these were also sold to the LMS after the war.  As noted above, 51 LMS locomotives were requisitioned by the WD in 1941, but 31 WD locomotives were subsequently purchased by the LMS in 1943 (including 8 of the requisitioned engines).

British Railways
As a result, 624 8Fs passed into British Railways ownership when Britain's railways were nationalised in 1948.  A further 39 (10 requisitioned) were purchased from MEF stock in 1948, and a final 3 (1 requisitioned) from the Longmoor Military Railway in 1957, bringing the total to 666.  The 8Fs were concentrated on the London Midland Region, but were also allocated to former LMS sheds on other regions.  Despite some having operated in Scotland by the LMS, they were not common on the Scottish Region under BR ownership as the later WD 'Austerity' 2-8-0 and 2-10-0 types were used instead.

Withdrawal

The 8Fs were successful and durable locomotives in BR service, with all 666 locomotives surviving until 1960 and routine withdrawals not beginning until 1964. The first to go in 1960 was 48616, followed two years later by 48009. 48773–48775 (the former Longmoor Military Railway locomotives which were the only 8Fs on the Scottish Region) were also withdrawn in 1962, but these were reinstated into London Midland Region stock in 1963. The remaining 664 were withdrawn between 1964 and 1968, with 150 surviving to the last year of steam on BR.

During the late 1960s, no. 48773 had diagonal yellow stripes painted on the cabsides to indicate that it could not run south of Crewe due to it being out of gauge for the new 25 kV AC overhead electrification.

Preservation 
Fourteen 8Fs are known to have survived with six LMS/BR locomotives being preserved in the UK; a seventh was used a spares donor for other preserved 8Fs as well as a number of new build projects. None of the pre-war 8Fs survived into preservation. Of the six LMS/BR locomotives that exist, only 48773 was purchased directly from BR for preservation following withdrawal from Rose Grove in July 1968; the remaining five - including 48518 which would later be used as a donor engine - were all rescued from Barry Scrapyard. Three members of the class have over the years been repatriated to the UK from Turkey, with one later sent to a museum in Israel. Two of the Turkish based 8F's which were to be repatriated to the UK, no's 45166 & 45170 made an appearance on the Channel 5 TV programme Monster Moves, this episode showed the two engines being moved 850 miles by rail across Turkey from Sivas to Izmir. 45166 would later end up in Israel as a static exhibit while 45170 is presently under restoration at Bo'ness. In addition, two Turkish Railway (TCDD) locomotives have been preserved in Turkey, and some more remain there in a derelict state. One locomotive has even survived in Iraq. The complete list is shown below.

Of the fourteen engines known to have survived into preservation, all the British located examples except 48173 & 45170 “Sir William McAlpine” have run in preservation (both are undergoing restoration). Two of the British-based engines have even seen main line operation: Nos. 48151 and 48773. These have been regular main line performers in recent years with 48773 being withdrawn from operation in 2000. As of 2019 none of the class is operational on the main line.

Some of the preserved examples have stars on their cabsides indicating that they have specially balanced wheelsets/motion. This practice began under the auspices of British Railways, to denote that locomotives thus treated were able to work fast, vacuum-braked goods services. Other members of the class have a yellow stripe on the cab meaning that they were not permitted to run south of Crewe as the WCML south of Crewe had been electrified with overhead wires. Another difference between the British engines and the locos that were exported from Britain is the position of the driver's controls. The British based engines like all LMS engines were left hand drive, the locos exported to Turkey and other countries were right-hand drive.

Loco numbers in bold mean their current number.

No 48518, formerly LMS 8518, built in 1944, was the only surviving LNER-built example. Formerly part of the 'Barry Ten', 48518 was used as a parts donor for 1014 County of Glamorgan and 45551 The Unknown Warrior. It was consequently dismantled and the frames were scrapped at Bury in mid-2013.

In popular culture
 No. 48600 was used in the 1953 Glenn Ford film Time Bomb, also called Terror on a Train.
 No. 8431 has been featured in Pink Floyd – The Wall, prominently during the songs "Vera" and "Bring the Boys Back Home".

Gallery

See also
 SS Thistlegorm

References

Bibliography

External links 

 The Stanier 8F Locomotive Society

 
8 Stanier 8F
2-8-0 locomotives
NBL locomotives
Vulcan Foundry locomotives
War Department locomotives
Beyer, Peacock locomotives
Railway locomotives introduced in 1935
Steam locomotives of Iran
Steam locomotives of Iraq
Steam locomotives of Italy
Steam locomotives of Mandatory Palestine
Steam locomotives of Turkey
Freight locomotives
Standard gauge steam locomotives of Great Britain
Standard gauge steam locomotives of Egypt
Standard gauge locomotives of Iran
Standard gauge locomotives of Iraq
Standard gauge steam locomotives of Israel
Standard gauge locomotives of Italy
Standard gauge locomotives of Mandatory Palestine
Standard gauge locomotives of Turkey
1′D h2 locomotives